Argelia is a town and  municipality located in the Department of Valle del Cauca, Colombia. The main means of income for this region is coffee. 

Argelia was founded by the Ospina-Agi brothers, and are now recognized by a donkey statue for their great efforts in transporting goods by donkey up the jungle terrain and steep hills.

 
Municipalities of Valle del Cauca Department